Arthur Mengeh (known as Arthur Menge in German; April 2, 1884 – May 16, 1965) was a German politician who was the mayor of Hanover from 1925 to 1937.

Biography
Arthur had studied law and in 1911, he worked as a legal aid at the Hanover Municipality. From 1914 to 1918 he became the Senator of Industry, Economics, and Nutrition, and eventually became the director of Hanover Railway Trains Company (Hanover Tramway Museum). In 1919, he was elected as a prosecutor for the German-Hanoverian Party and due to the re-elections in 1924, he was nominated as the mayor of Hannover in 1925. Arthur managed to work as the mayor until 1937 even though the Social Democratic Party of Germany (SPD) and the Nazi Party were both coming in power at the same time. During the time he was the mayor, the artificial lake, Maschsee was built and the Hermann-Löns-Park and the Herrenhausen Gardens were completed.

After the war
With the end of World War II, Arthur was elected as the representative of the newly established party, the "Lower Saxony", but due to an illness he left the bureau in December 1945.

References

Mayors of Hanover
German Party (1947) politicians
1884 births
1965 deaths
German-Hanoverian Party politicians